The men's 100 kg weightlifting competitions at the 1988 Summer Olympics in Seoul took place on 26 September at the Olympic Weightlifting Gymnasium. It was the third appearance of the heavyweight I class.

Results

References

Weightlifting at the 1988 Summer Olympics